Barão is a municipality in the state of Rio Grande do Sul, Brazil. It includes the districts Arroio Canoas, Francesa Alta, General Neto and Francesa Baixa. Barão is 80 km from Porto Alegre.
The municipality is bordered by Carlos Barbosa (north), São Vendelino (east), Bom Princípio (southeast), Tupandi (southeast), São Pedro da Serra (south), Salvador do Sul (southwest), Poço das Antas (southwest), and Boa Vista do Sul (northwest).

The residents are primarily of German Brazilian descent.

See also
List of municipalities in Rio Grande do Sul

References

External links 
 www.cnm.org.br municipal history

Municipalities in Rio Grande do Sul